The Mattstock (also known as Mattstogg) (1,936 m) is a mountain of the Appenzell Alps, overlooking the Walensee in the canton of St. Gallen. It lies south of the Speer, on the range between the Toggenburg and the Linth valley.

References

External links
Mattstock on Hikr

Mountains of Switzerland
Mountains of the canton of St. Gallen
Mountains of the Alps
Appenzell Alps
One-thousanders of Switzerland